Mayovka, prior to 1945 known by its German name Georgenburg was a rural locality in Chernyakhovsky District of Kaliningrad Oblast, Russia.

It was founded around the Ordensburg fortress Georgenburg ("George's castle") by the Teutonic Order. This fortress is still the best preserved medieval castle in the oblast. The German-inhabited town became famous from a local stable for the Trakehner horse breed.

The town became a part of the Soviet Union in 1945 following World War II and was repopulated with Russians. It was given its present name, which means a celebration of the International Workers' Day (May 1) in Russian.

Kaliningrad Oblast
Castles in Russia
Castles of the Teutonic Knights